Searsia gerrardii, the Drakensberg karee, is a deciduous, drought resistant tree, native to South Africa. It reaches a height of up to 5 metres. It is frost hardy and occurs naturally in mountain areas, often along riverbanks. The tree has a graceful drooping habit. It produces small yellowish flowers which, on female trees, turn into small fruits which are relished by birds. This tree makes a lovely shade tree for a small garden.

References

gerrardii
Trees of South Africa
Drought-tolerant trees
Ornamental trees